Uromyces euphorbiae is a plant pathogen infecting poinsettias.

References

External links
 Index Fungorum
 USDA ARS Fungal Database

Fungal plant pathogens and diseases
Ornamental plant pathogens and diseases
euphorbiae
Fungi described in 1873